The men's shot put event at the 1996 Summer Olympics in Atlanta, Georgia. There were 36 competitors from 26 nations, with twelve athletes reaching the final. The maximum number of athletes per nation had been set at 3 since the 1930 Olympic Congress. The event took place on July 26, 1996. The event was won by Randy Barnes of the United States, the nation's second consecutive and 16th overall victory in the men's shot put. Barnes was the 11th man to win multiple medals in the event, and the first to do so in nonconsecutive Games. His teammate John Godina took silver, while Oleksandr Bagach earned Ukraine's first medal in the event with a bronze.

Background

This was the 23rd appearance of the event, which is one of 12 athletics events to have been held at every Summer Olympics. The only returning finalist from the 1992 Games was seventh-place finisher Dragan Perić, then an Independent Olympic Participant and now representing Yugoslavia. The 1988 silver medalist Randy Barnes of the United States, who set a world record in 1990 that is still extant in 2020, also returned after missing the 1992 Games while suspended. Barnes was the favorite, with the best throw of the year to date.

American Samoa, Belarus, Cyprus, the Czech Republic, Kazakhstan, Lithuania, Ukraine, Uzbekistan, and Venezuela each made their debut in the men's shot put. The United States made its 22nd appearance, most of any nation, having missed only the boycotted 1980 Games.

Competition format

The competition used the two-round format introduced in 1936, with the qualifying round completely separate from the divided final. In qualifying, each athlete received three attempts; those recording a mark of at least 19.80 metres advanced to the final. If fewer than 12 athletes achieved that distance, the top 12 would advance. The results of the qualifying round were then ignored. Finalists received three throws each, with the top eight competitors receiving an additional three attempts. The best distance among those six throws counted.

Records

The standing world and Olympic records prior to the 1996 Games were as follows.

No new world or Olympic records were set during the competition.

Schedule

All times are Eastern Daylight Time (UTC-4)

Results

Qualification

Final

See also
 1995 World Championships in Athletics – Men's shot put
 1997 World Championships in Athletics – Men's shot put

References

External links
 Official Report
 Results

S
Shot put at the Olympics
Men's events at the 1996 Summer Olympics